Sardasht (also known as Sardasht-e Bashākerd) is a city and capital of Bashagard County, Hormozgan province, Iran. At the 2006 census, its population was 928, in 204 families.

References 

Populated places in Bashagard County
Cities in Hormozgan Province